Harmen Wind (Leeuwarden, 24 December 1945 – Doesburg, 1 October 2010) was a Dutch poet and writer. Wind grew up in Oldeboorn and lived in Doesburg. As a writer he published both in Dutch and Frisian.

Career
In 2002, Het verzet was published by De Arbeiderspers.

In 2013, Rekkenskip was published.

On 30 November 2015, Wind's poems, along with Albertina Soepboer, Arjen Hut, Bartle Lavermann, Sannemaj Betten, Wilco Berga, A. de Tollenaar, C. Budding, H.H. ter Balk and Loet Hin, were selected to represent the Frisian literature in Malta.

Prizes 
He won several prizes for his literary work:

 1987: Fedde Schurerpriis for Ut ein
 2003: Debutantenprijs for Het verzet
 2006: Rink van der Veldepriis for It ferset

References

External links 

 Informatie over Harmen Wind bij Tresoar/Sirkwy
 Harmen Wind op worldcat.org
 Teake Oppewal: 'Levensbericht. Harmen Wind'. In: Jaarboek van de Maatschappij der Nederlandse Letterkunde te Leiden, jrg. 2013–2014, pag. 195–207

1945 births
2010 deaths
West Frisian-language writers
Dutch poets
Dutch writers